Košarkaški klub Partizan is a professional basketball club based in Belgrade, Serbia that competes in the Basketball League of Serbia, Adriatic League and Euroleague. The club was founded on 4 October 1945, as a basketball section of the Sports Association of the Central House of the Yugoslav Army.

The most significant trophy the club has won is the European Champion trophy at the Final Four of the Euroleague in Istanbul in 1992. KK Partizan was not allowed to defend the Euroleague title in the 1992–93 season, because of UN sanctions. They also won 3 Radivoj Korać Cups in 1978, 1979 and 1989. Other notable results include 3rd places in Champions Cup in 1982 and 1988, participation in Final Fours in 1998 and 2010, and Korać Cup final in 1974 and semifinal in 1975.

Partizan recorded its biggest win in European competitions on November 6, 1985 in Belgrade against DBV Charlottenburg (now ALBA Berlin). The final result was 129:79, with Partizan winning by 50 points. The biggest defeat happened on November 15, 2013 in Moscow when CSKA won by 42 points, 88:46.

Matches 
This is a list of all Partizan's matches in official FIBA Europe and Euroleague Basketball (company) European club competitions.

1966–79

1980–89

1990–99

2000–09

2010–present

2020–present

Statistics

Biggest victory

Biggest defeat

References

External sources
Basketball competition results at linguasport.com

KK Partizan